In geometry, a Johnson solid is a strictly convex polyhedron each face of which is a regular polygon. There is no requirement that each face must be the same polygon, or that the same polygons join around each vertex. An example of a Johnson solid is the square-based pyramid with equilateral sides; it has 1 square face and 4 triangular faces. Some authors require that the solid not be uniform (i.e., not Platonic solid, Archimedean solid, uniform prism, or uniform antiprism) before they refer to it as a "Johnson solid".

As in any strictly convex solid, at least three faces meet at every vertex, and the total of their angles is less than 360 degrees. Since a regular polygon has angles at least 60 degrees, it follows that at most five faces meet at any vertex. The pentagonal pyramid is an example that has a degree-5 vertex.

Although there is no obvious restriction that any given regular polygon cannot be a face of a Johnson solid, it turns out that the faces of Johnson solids which are not uniform (i.e., not a Platonic solid, Archimedean solid, uniform prism, or uniform antiprism) always have 3, 4, 5, 6, 8, or 10 sides.

In 1966, Norman Johnson published a list which included all 92 Johnson solids (excluding the 5 Platonic solids, the 13 Archimedean solids, the infinitely many uniform prisms, and the infinitely many uniform antiprisms), and gave them their names and numbers. He did not prove that there were only 92, but he did conjecture that there were no others. Victor Zalgaller in 1969 proved that Johnson's list was complete.

Of the Johnson solids, the elongated square gyrobicupola, also called the pseudorhombicuboctahedron, is unique in being locally vertex-uniform: there are 4 faces at each vertex, and their arrangement is always the same: 3 squares and 1 triangle. However, it is not vertex-transitive, as it has different isometry at different vertices, making it a Johnson solid rather than an Archimedean solid.

Names 
The naming of Johnson solids follows a flexible and precise descriptive formula, such that many solids can be named in different ways without compromising their accuracy as a description. Most Johnson solids can be constructed from the first few (pyramids, cupolae, and rotundas), together with the Platonic and Archimedean solids, prisms, and antiprisms; the centre of a particular solid's name will reflect these ingredients. From there, a series of prefixes are attached to the word to indicate additions, rotations, and transformations:

Bi-[<>] indicates that two copies of the solid in question are joined base-to-base. For cupolae and rotundas, the solids can be joined so that either like faces (ortho-) or unlike faces (gyro-[*]) meet. Using this nomenclature, an octahedron can be described as a  square bipyramid[4<>], a cuboctahedron as a triangular gyrobicupola[3cc*], and an icosidodecahedron as a pentagonal gyrobirotunda[5rr*].
Elongated[=] indicates a prism is joined to the base of the solid in question, or between the bases in the case of Bi- solids. A rhombicuboctahedron can thus be described as an elongated square orthobicupola.
Gyroelongated[z] indicates an antiprism is joined to the base of the solid in question or between the bases in the case of Bi- solids. An icosahedron can thus be described as a gyroelongated pentagonal bipyramid.
Augmented[+] indicates another polyhedron, namely a pyramid or cupola, is joined to one or more faces of the solid in question.
Diminished[-] indicates a pyramid or cupola is removed from one or more faces of the solid in question.
Gyrate[*] indicates a cupola mounted on or featured in the solid in question is rotated such that different edges match up, as in the difference between ortho- and gyrobicupolae.

The last three operations—augmentation, diminution, and gyration—can be performed multiple times for certain large solids.  Bi- & Tri- indicate a double and triple operation respectively. For example, a bigyrate solid has two rotated cupolae, and a tridiminished solid has three removed pyramids or cupolae.

In certain large solids, a distinction is made between solids where altered faces are parallel and solids where altered faces are oblique. Para- indicates the former, that the solid in question has altered parallel faces, and meta- the latter, altered oblique faces. For example, a parabiaugmented solid has had two parallel faces augmented, and a metabigyrate solid has had 2 oblique faces gyrated.

The last few Johnson solids have names based on certain polygon complexes from which they are assembled. These names are defined by Johnson
with the following nomenclature:

A lune is a complex of two triangles attached to opposite sides of a square.
Spheno- indicates a wedgelike complex formed by two adjacent lunes. Dispheno- indicates two such complexes.
Hebespheno- indicates a blunt complex of two lunes separated by a third lune.
Corona is a crownlike complex of eight triangles.
Megacorona is a larger crownlike complex of 12 triangles.
The suffix -cingulum indicates a belt of 12 triangles.

Enumeration

Pyramids, cupolae, and rotunda 
The first 6 Johnson solids are pyramids, cupolae, or rotundas with at most 5 lateral faces. Pyramids and cupolae with 6 or more lateral faces are coplanar and are hence not Johnson solids.

Pyramids 
The first two Johnson solids, J1 and J2, are pyramids. The triangular pyramid is the regular tetrahedron, so it is not a Johnson solid. They represent sections of regular polyhedra.

Cupolae and rotunda 
The next four Johnson solids are three cupolae and one rotunda. They represent sections of uniform polyhedra.

Modified pyramids 
Johnson solids 7 to 17 are derived from pyramids.

Elongated and gyroelongated pyramids 

In the gyroelongated triangular pyramid, three pairs of adjacent triangles are coplanar and form non-square rhombi, so it is not a Johnson solid.

Bipyramids 
The square bipyramid is the regular octahedron, while the gyroelongated pentagonal bipyramid is the regular icosahedron, so they are not Johnson solids. In the gyroelongated triangular bipyramid, six pairs of adjacent triangles are coplanar and form non-square rhombi, so it is also not a Johnson solid.

Modified cupolae and rotundas 
Johnson solids 18 to 48 are derived from cupolae and rotundas.

Elongated and gyroelongated cupolae and rotundas

Bicupolae 
The triangular gyrobicupola is an Archimedean solid (in this case the cuboctahedron), so it is not a Johnson solid.

Cupola-rotundas and birotundas 
The pentagonal gyrobirotunda is an Archimedean solid (in this case the icosidodecahedron), so it is not a Johnson solid.

Elongated bicupolae 
The elongated square orthobicupola is an Archimedean solid (in this case the rhombicuboctahedron), so it is not a Johnson solid.

Elongated cupola-rotundas and birotundas

Gyroelongated bicupolae, cupola-rotundas, and birotundas 
These Johnson solids have 2 chiral forms.

Augmented prisms 
Johnson solids 49 to 57 are built by augmenting the sides of prisms with square pyramids. 

J8 and J15 would also fit here, as an augmented square prism and biaugmented square prism.

Modified Platonic solids 
Johnson solids 58 to 64 are built by augmenting or diminishing Platonic solids.

Augmented dodecahedra

Diminished and augmented diminished icosahedra

Modified Archimedean solids 
Johnson solids 65 to 83 are built by augmenting, diminishing or gyrating Archimedean solids.

Augmented Archimedean solids

Gyrate and diminished rhombicosidodecahedra 

J37 would also appear here as a duplicate (it is a gyrate rhombicuboctahedron).

Other gyrate and diminished archimedean solids 
Other archimedean solids can be gyrated and diminished, but they all result in previously counted solids.

Elementary solids 
Johnson solids 84 to 92 are not derived from "cut-and-paste" manipulations of uniform solids.

Snub antiprisms 
The snub antiprisms can be constructed as an alternation of a truncated antiprism. The gyrobianticupolae are another construction for the snub antiprisms. Only snub antiprisms with at most 4 sides can be constructed from regular polygons. The snub triangular antiprism is the regular icosahedron, so it is not a Johnson solid.

Others

Classification by types of faces

Triangle-faced Johnson solids 
Five Johnson solids are deltahedra, with all equilateral triangle faces:

Triangle and square-faced Johnson solids 
Twenty four Johnson solids have only triangle or square faces:

Triangle and pentagon-faced Johnson solids 
Eleven Johnson solids have only triangle and pentagon faces:

Triangle, square, and pentagon-faced Johnson solids 
Twenty Johnson solids have only triangle, square, and pentagon faces:

Triangle, square, and hexagon-faced Johnson solids 
Eight Johnson solids have only triangle, square, and hexagon faces:

Triangle, square, and octagon-faced Johnson solids 
Five Johnson solids have only triangle, square, and octagon faces:

Triangle, pentagon, and decagon-faced Johnson solids 
Two Johnson solids have only triangle, pentagon, and decagon faces:

Triangle, square, pentagon, and hexagon-faced Johnson solids 
Only one Johnson solid has triangle, square, pentagon, and hexagon faces:

Triangle, square, pentagon, and decagon-faced Johnson solids 
Sixteen Johnson solids have only triangle, square, pentagon, and decagon faces:

Circumscribable Johnson solids 
25 of the Johnson solids have vertices that exist on the surface of a sphere: 1–6,11,19,27,34,37,62,63,72–83. All of them can be seen to be related to a regular or uniform polyhedra by gyration, diminishment, or dissection.

See also 
 Near-miss Johnson solid
 Catalan solid
 Toroidal polyhedron

References
 Contains the original enumeration of the 92 solids and the conjecture that there are no others.
  The first proof that there are only 92 Johnson solids. English translation:   
  Chapter 3 Further Convex polyhedra
  
olyhedra." J. Math. Sci. 162, 710-729, 2009.

External links
 
Paper Models of Polyhedra Many links
Johnson Solids by George W. Hart.
Images of all 92 solids, categorized, on one page

VRML models of Johnson Solids by Jim McNeill
VRML models of Johnson Solids by Vladimir Bulatov
CRF polychora discovery project attempts to discover CRF polychora (Convex 4-dimensional polytopes with Regular polygons as 2-dimensional Faces), a generalization of the Johnson solids to 4-dimensional space
https://levskaya.github.io/polyhedronisme/ a generator of polyhedrons and Conway operations applied to them, including Johnson solids.